Sean Bailey (born May 20, 1996) is an American professional climber. He represents the United States at IFSC Climbing World Cup in lead, and has two podium finishes at Boulder World Cups, including a win at Salt Lake City in May 2021 and three in lead, including two gold medals, at Villars and Chamonix in July 2021.

Early life and youth competitions
Bailey was born in Seattle and began climbing at age 5 with parents, who were both climbers. He began competing with the youth team at the Vertical World climbing gym and won the USA Climbing Sport Climbing Series Youth National Championship at age 17.

Senior competitions

At age 17, Bailey won the American Bouldering Series, the senior national bouldering competition in the United States. He also won the 2018 USA Climbing Sport and Speed Nationals and the 2019 USA Climbing Bouldering Nationals.

Bailey has five IFSC World Cup podium finishes, first place in boulders at Salt Lake City in 2021 and in lead at Villars and Chamonix in 2021, and second place at Vail in 2018. Bailey finished the Lead World Cup season in second place overall. In July 2022, he made his first podium finish of the 2022 IFSC Climbing World Cup series with a bronze medal in lead at Chamonix.

In 2019, Bailey finished ninth at the Olympic qualifying event in Toulouse, one place short of securing a spot at the 2020 Summer Olympics.

Rock climbing
In June 2016, Bailey sent Biographie, a  route in Céüse, France. He sent another 5.15a in March 2019, Joe Mama in Oliana, Spain.

In 2020, he sent two  boulders, Box Therapy in Rocky Mountain National Park, Colorado, in October and Grand Illusion in Little Cottonwood Canyon, Utah, in November. Earlier that year, Bailey sent his first  boulder, Pegasus in Joe's Valley, Utah.

In September 2021, Bailey sent Bibliographie, a  route just a few meters away from his previous project, Biographie, in Céüse. The route was first climbed by Alex Megos in 2020, and was repeated by Stefano Ghisolfi earlier in 2021.

References

External links 

 Outdoor Research profile

Living people
1996 births
People from Seattle
American rock climbers
Sportspeople from Washington (state)
IFSC Climbing World Cup overall medalists